The 1983 Fort Lauderdale Strikers season was the seventh season of the Fort Lauderdale Striker's team, and the club's seventeenth season in professional soccer.  This year the team made it to the quarterfinals of the North American Soccer League playoffs.  It would be the last year of the club's incarnation as the Fort Lauderdale Strikers in the original NASL.  The following year they relocated to Minnesota for the 1984 season and became the Minnesota Strikers.

Background

Review

Competitions

NASL regular season

Results summaries

Results by round

Match reports

NASL Playoffs

Quarterfinals

Bracket

Match reports

Statistics

Transfers

References 

1983
Fort Lauderdale Strikers
Fort Lauderdale Strikers
Fort Lauderdale